The Collahuasi mine is a large copper mine located at high altitude in the north of Chile in the Tarapaca Region. Collahuasi represents one of the largest copper reserves in Chile and in the world having estimated reserves of 3.93 billion tonnes of ore grading 0.66% copper.

The mine produced 560,000 tonnes of copper in 2018, making it one of the world's largest copper mines.

References 

Copper mines in Chile
Mines in Tarapacá Region
Surface mines in Chile